Henry Mountbatten may refer to:

Prince Harry, Duke of Sussex (born 1984; formally Prince Henry of Wales), younger son of the Prince of Wales and grandson of the Queen.
Henry Mountbatten, Earl of Medina (born 1991), only son and heir of George Mountbatten, 4th Marquess of Milford Haven.